The following is a list of lanes, arcades and pedestrian malls in the central business district of Perth, Western Australia.

The first plan of Perth, developed in 1829 by the Surveyor-General, John Septimus Roe, was a semi-regular grid pattern bounded by Mount Eliza to the west, wetlands to the north, with three principal streets running parallel to the Swan River and three streets running north–south. The original allotments ran through from street to street in a north–south direction so that properties generally had two frontages.

Following the completion of the central Perth railway station in 1881, the area bounded by William and Barrack Streets was consolidated as the commercial and retail centre of Perth. Banks, insurance buildings, professional and commercial offices were constructed along St Georges Terrace, with businesses, shops and warehouses developing in Wellington, Murray and Hay Streets. A number of hotels and theatres were also built in this central area and large department stores, such as Foy & Gibson and Sandover established along the tram route and the shopping strip along Hay Street. Shopping arcades and passageways were also developed in this period, allowing people to move with ease through the increasingly busy Perth streets and providing spaces for additional commercial premises outlets within the narrow blocks.

List of lanes 

The City of Perth has documented that there are 34 lanes in the city centre, of which nine are owned (or part owned) by the City and the remaining 25 are privately owned. 

 Grand Lane (6)
 Howard Lane (34)
 McLean Lane (8)
 Mercantile Lane (33)
 Munster Lane (14)
 Prince Lane (4)
 Shafto Lane (12)
 Wolf Lane (15)

List of arcades 

 140 (comprising Globe, Mitchell and Railway Lanes)
 160 Central
 Arcade 800
 Bon Marché Arcade
 Brookfield Place
 Carillon Arcade
 City Arcade
 Cloisters Arcade
 Cremorne Arcade
 Enex100
 Gledden Arcade
 London Court
 McNess Royal Arcade
 Piccadilly Arcade
 Plaza Arcade
 Raine Square
 St Martin's Arcade
 Trinity Arcade
 Wesley Quarter (aka Wesley Arcade)

Historic 
 Baird's Arcade (demolished 2003)
 Central Arcade (demolished 1923 to create Forrest Place)
 Padbury Arcade (demolished 1987 to create Forrest Chase)
 Terrace Arcade (demolished 1981 to create the R&I Bank Tower)
 Wanamba Arcade (closed 1980)
 Zimpels Arcade (closed)

List of pedestrian malls
 Forrest Place
 Hay Street Mall
 James Street Mall
 Murray Street Mall

See also
Colonial Town Plans of Perth
Lanes and arcades of Melbourne

References 

Perth
Perth, Western Australia-related lists